State Highway 312 (SH 312) is a proposed state highway from Alt. US 90 just west of SH 6 south to Interstate 69/U.S. Highway 59.  The route was originally designated in 1986 as SH 362, and was renumbered as SH 312 in 1987. , the highway has yet to be built.

The original SH 312 was designated on March 21, 1939, from Karnes City southwest to the Atascosa/Karnes County Line. On September 26, 1939, this became part of SH 80.

References

312